DGG may refer to:

 Deutsche Geophysikalische Gesellschaft, a society for geophysics
 Deutsche Grammophon Gesellschaft, a record label
 Discrete Global Grid
Dutch Game Garden an organization with the aim of promoting and improving the video games industry in the Netherlands
 Red Dog Airport (FAA location identifier: DGG), an airport in Alaska
 Destiny.gg, the website of streamer Destiny

See also 
 Doga language (ISO 639 code: dgg), a language of Papua New Guinea